Princess Adelgunde of Bavaria (Full German name: Adelgunde Marie Auguste Therese Prinzessin von Bayern) (17 October 1870 – 4 January 1958) was a Princess of Bavaria by birth and Princess of Hohenzollern through her marriage to William, Prince of Hohenzollern. Adelgunde was the second eldest child of Ludwig III of Bavaria and his wife Maria Theresia of Austria-Este.

Marriage
Adelgunde married Prince Wilhelm of Hohenzollern, eldest son of Leopold, Prince of Hohenzollern and Infanta Antónia of Portugal, on 20 January 1915 in Munich, Bavaria, Germany. Adelgunde and William had no children.

Ancestry

References

1870 births
1958 deaths
House of Wittelsbach
Nobility from Munich
Bavarian princesses
Princesses of Hohenzollern-Sigmaringen
German Roman Catholics
Daughters of kings